"Rich Girls" (stylised as "Rich Girl$") is the breakthrough single by Canadian pop rock group Down with Webster from the band's 2009 EP, Time to Win, Vol. 1. The song was very successful  in Canada, peaking at #21 on the Canadian Hot 100 and raising Down with Webster's popularity in their native country.

In April 2010, the song was certified Platinum by the CRIA in digital downloads.

Background
The song borrows many elements from the original version by Hall & Oates which was a #1 hit on the Billboard Hot 100. Although the song is not a full cover, the song samples the chorus and also lifts the melody and some lyrics. In an interview Andrew "Marty" Martino, the drummer for Down with Webster, said that Hall and Oates gave the song a "thumbs up".

Music video
The music video was shot in Los Angeles in November, 2009 and was directed by Josh Forbes. It debuted on MuchMusic Countdown at #30 in the week of December 10, 2009. The video reached #1 on the Countdown for the week of April 1, 2010.

In this music video, a rich girl's parents are going away for a trip, while the rich girl is staying home and is given instructions on how to care of the house. Before leaving, the girl's mother tell her one last rule which is to not throw any parties or have any boys over. However, as soon as the parents leave, the rich girl contacts Down with Webster and invites several of her friends and boys over. Most of the video cuts between scenes taking place at the pool and inside the mansion where everyone, including the staff, get involved in wild antics such as playing beer pong with champagne glasses, filling the Super-Soaker with alcohol and spraying them in people's mouth. By nightfall, the party is still going with guests throwing toilet paper at the trees in the backyard and tossing balloons off the balcony. Unfortunately, the rich girl's parents returned and are shocked and appalled that there was a party going on. The parents confront their daughter about her disobedience only for the father getting pushed into the pool by a guest. As the rich girl laughs, her mother shoves her into the pool and pretty soon everyone else jumps into the pool with the staff being too intoxicated to do anything. The final shot shows the rich girl's dog looking and sniffing around near a guest who passed out.

Usage in media

"Rich Girl$" was featured on the compilation album of the Juno Awards of 2010. It was also covered by the group  Playback early on during the second season of The X Factor.

Awards and nominations

Canadian Radio Music Awards

|-
| 2011 || "Rich Girl$" || Best Group or Solo Artist ||

MuchMusic Video Awards

|-
| 2010 || "Rich Girl$" || UR Fave: New Artist ||

Chart performance
"Rich Girl$" debuted on the Canadian Hot 100 at #47 on the week of October 24, 2009 and peaked at #21 on the week of January 9, 2010. The song spent a total of 20 weeks on the chart. The song also debuted at #78 on the U.S. Hot 100 Airplay and peaked at #76. The song spent a total of 5 weeks on the Hot 100 Airplay chart.

Charts

Certifications

References

External links

2009 singles
Down with Webster songs
2009 songs
Universal Records singles
Songs written by Daryl Hall